Eupithecia nimbosa is a moth in the family Geometridae first described by George Duryea Hulst in 1896. It is widespread in the Rocky Mountains, from Arizona to the Canada–US border.

The wingspan is 21–22 mm. The forewings are light gray, with prominent light and dark alternate banding.

Subspecies
Eupithecia nimbosa nimbosa
Eupithecia nimbosa bindata Pearsall, 1910 (Washington, California)

References

Moths described in 1896
nimbosa
Moths of North America